"Living in America" is the second single by Swedish new wave band The Sounds from their debut album Living In America. The song reached number 3 in the Swedish single charts and was the band's first single released in the United States.

Trivia
The song is featured in the 2010 video game, Rock Band 3.
The song is the theme song for the television series Welcome to Sweden.

Track listings
CD 0927-48443-5
 "Living in America" (3:28)
 "The S.O.U.N.D.S (In-house Version)" (3:39)

Charts

Weekly charts

Year-end charts

References

2002 singles